Ian A. Banbury (born 27 November 1957) was a British cyclist. He won the bronze medal in the team pursuit at the 1976 Montreal Games. He raced as an amateur for the Hemel Hempstead cycling club and as a professional for a number of British-based teams, including Holdsworth-Campagnolo, MAN Trucks, and Moore Large. He competed on the road and the track, particularly in the individual and team pursuit events.

References

1957 births
Living people
Cyclists at the 1976 Summer Olympics
Olympic cyclists of Great Britain
Olympic bronze medallists for Great Britain
Olympic medalists in cycling
English male cyclists
Sportspeople from Hemel Hempstead
English Olympic medallists
Medalists at the 1976 Summer Olympics